The Anguilla Patriotic Movement is a political party in Anguilla. 
At the last elections, 21 February 2005, the party won no seats.

Electoral results

Political parties in Anguilla